Ben McCain (born 25 June 1955) is an American actor, broadcaster, producer and one half of The McCain Brothers, a singing-songwriting duo.  McCain appeared as news anchor Aries West in MGM's comedy Bio-Dome, the character, Travis, in Roger Corman's remake Humanoids From The Deep and the Mayor of Gold Lick in Bruce Campbell's My Name Is Bruce. Ben and his brother, Butch McCain also wrote and performed the theme song in My Name is Bruce titled "The Legend of Guan Di". McCain had a recurring role as news anchor Brock Thompson in ABC's Lois & Clark: The New Adventures of Superman and another recurring role as newscaster Don MacDonald in SyFy's Black Scorpion.

Early life
Born in Muleshoe, Texas, and raised on a farm near Bovina in Parmer County. McCain is a graduate of Bovina High School, South Plains College in Levelland, Texas, and West Texas State University now West Texas A&M University in Canyon, Texas.

Career
Ben McCain and his brother, Butch McCain, co-hosted a morning television program in Oklahoma City from 1981 to 1987 at KTVY (NBC affiliate) and from 1987 to 1994 the brothers hosted "Good Morning Oklahoma" and anchored the noon newscast at KOCO-TV (ABC affiliate).  Ben anchored the news and Butch served as the weather anchor.

While hosting their daily morning television program, the brothers appeared on the syndicated TV show Hee Haw twice in the 1980s as well as ABC soap operas General Hospital, All My Children and Loving.[3] Ben and his brother, Butch, made 3 appearances on General Hospital.

The McCain Brothers did live segments on the KCBS-TV morning show in Los Angeles in 2000.

The McCain Brothers have recorded four CDs on Rise and Shine Records. The country single, "If Love Was a Crime I Couldn't Get Arrested" went number one on 50,000-watt KOMA radio in 1985. They also hosted a syndicated TV music show called "The McCain Brothers Show."

Ben and his brother, Butch, have appeared in numerous films together including MGM's comedy Bio-Dome,[4] Roger Corman's Humanoids from the Deep and Bruce Campbell's My Name is Bruce, where they wrote and performed the theme song, "The Legend of Guan Di".[5] In the movie, Ben plays the mayor and Butch has dual roles as the sheriff and a uni-browed farmer. In a 1997 Daily Variety article, columnist Andrew Hindes described the McCain Brothers as "multi-hyphenated".[6]

McCain has been nominated twice for Los Angeles Area Emmy awards.  The first time in 2010 as Producer and Host for the program "So-Cal's Best Iconic Movie Locations" and again in 2012 as Producer for the program "Leimert Park Today". McCain worked as a producer, host and reporter for Time Warner Cable from 2002 to 2012.

McCain narrated the audio book NICHOLAS: The Fantastic Origins of Santa Claus in 2013.

Ben McCain began co-anchoring a news show for Torrance CitiCable in 2000. On April 9, 2020, McCain began anchoring live COVID-19 updates for Torrance CitiCable. April 15, 2021 McCain announced that it would be his final time anchoring for Torrance CitiCable's "COVID-19 Today" stating that he was moving to Franklin, Tennessee, with his wife and son.

Filmography

References

External links
 
 McCain Brothers
 Lois and Clark: The New Adventures of Superman
 McCain Brothers Multi-Hyphenated
 Emmy Nomination

American male actors
Living people
People from Muleshoe, Texas
American radio personalities
Television anchors from Oklahoma City
South Plains College alumni
People from Parmer County, Texas
1955 births
Journalists from Texas